The  is an award established by the city of Fukuoka and the Fukuoka City International Foundation (formerly The Yokatopia Foundation) to honor the outstanding work of individuals or organizations in preserving or creating Asian culture. There are three prize categories: Grand Prize, Academic Prize, and Arts and Culture Prize.

In 1989, Fukuoka held the Asia-Pacific Exposition (referred to as "Yokatopia") with the concept of interaction between the Asia-Pacific region. The prize program was inaugurated in the following year to carry on the spirit of the Expo, and ever since then, the prizes have been given annually and the related official events including the award ceremony and the public forums by the prize winners have been held in every September, also known as "Asian Party" in Fukuoka. In 1999, the school visits were added into the program to give a special lecture to children by the prize winners.

Prize categories

Grand Prize
To be presented to an individual or an organization in either the field of academics or arts and culture. The laureate must have made outstanding contributions to the preservation and creation of Asian culture and have exhibited the significance of Asian culture to the world. The prize is endowed with 5 million yen.

Academic Prize
To be presented to one or two individuals or organizations that have made outstanding achievements in the field of Asian studies, such as social and human sciences, contributing to the world’s understanding of Asia. The prize is endowed with 3 million yen.

Arts and Culture Prize
To be presented to one or two individuals or organizations who have made outstanding contributions in the diverse arts and culture of Asia. The category includes a wide range of fields such as the fine arts, literature, music, drama, dance, film, architecture, and so forth. The prize is endowed with 3 million yen.

Geographical focus
It is limited to East, South, and Southeast Asia.

List of recipients

References

External links
 

Awards established in 1990
Asian awards
Visual arts awards
Academic awards
Cultural organizations based in Japan
Organizations based in Fukuoka Prefecture